Bonar-e Ab-e Shirin (also Romanized as Bonār-e Āb-e Shīrīn and Bonār Āb Shīrīn) is a village in Ziarat Rural District, in the Central District of Dashtestan County, Bushehr Province, Iran. At the 2006 census, its population was 489, in 111 families.

References 

Populated places in Dashtestan County